Chay Thomas Lapin (born February 25, 1987) is an American water polo goalkeeper. While playing at the University of California, Los Angeles, he set the school's all-time saves record. He also played for the United States national team at the 2012 Summer Olympics.

Career

High school
Lapin played water polo at Long Beach Wilson High School from 2001 to 2004. In 2004, he was named to the California-Hawaii All-America first team and was also named the CIF player of the year.

College
Lapin then went to UCLA, where he redshirted the 2005 season. In 2006, he started 15 games at goalkeeper and had a 4.87 goals against average. The following year, he started 21 games, had a 6.90 goals against average, and was named to the ACWPC All-America third team.

Lapin started 23 games in 2008. He had 206 saves and a 6.35 goals against average. In 2009, he started 24 games, made 205 saves, and had a 4.82 goals against average. His performance helped UCLA win the MPSF Tournament and reach the finals of the NCAA Championship that year. Lapin was named to the ACWPC All-America second team. He finished his college career with 719 total saves, which set a school record.

International
Lapin was a backup goalkeeper for the U.S. national team at the 2011 and 2012 FINA World League Super Finals. Both times, the U.S. finished in fourth place. At the 2012 Summer Olympics, he made eight saves, and the U.S. was eighth.

Personal
Lapin was born in Fountain Valley, California, on February 25, 1987. He is 6 feet, 6 and a half inches tall. He resides in Redondo Beach, California. Recently, Lapin married the love of his life, model Kim Nelson. Lapin is one of four children and dearly loves his two younger brothers, Taylor (born 1989, also a water polo player), and Blayke (born 1999, a baseball player), and his only sister, Jayden Raye (born 1996, a singer/songwriter who plays guitar).

See also
 List of men's Olympic water polo tournament goalkeepers

References

External links
 

1987 births
Living people
Sportspeople from California
People from Fountain Valley, California
American male water polo players
Water polo goalkeepers
Olympic water polo players of the United States
Water polo players at the 2012 Summer Olympics
Pan American Games gold medalists for the United States
Pan American Games medalists in water polo
Water polo players at the 2011 Pan American Games
Medalists at the 2011 Pan American Games
UCLA Bruins men's water polo players